Palo Alto is a 2007 independent film that is set in Palo Alto, California and was made by Brad Leong, Tony Vallone, and Daniel Engelhardt, three filmmakers who are locals of that city.  The plot centers on four college freshmen on their last night of Thanksgiving break, their first time back since leaving for school.

Palo Alto stars Aaron Ashmore, Johnny Lewis, Justin Mentell, Autumn Reeser, Ben Savage and Tom Arnold.

Plot
The film opens with four college freshmen—Alec, Nolan, Patrick and Ryan—sneaking into an old classroom to retrieve an item confiscated by a freshman high school teacher. Their conversation is interrupted when campus security discovers them. The friends dart through the halls of the school and manage to avoid capture. Now in front of Palo Alto High, the friends say their goodbyes for the evening.

Alone and concerned his night will end with no excitement, Alec befriends an older fraternity brother, Anthony.  The two quickly bond through mutual initiation stories, and the admiration Alec has for the more experienced partier.

On a school bus, Morgan, in his twenty-fifth year as a bus driver, discovers his old passenger Nolan at a public bus stop. The two catch up and Morgan tries his luck as cupid by inviting a young girl on board (Jaime). Nolan and Jaime continue, inventing adventures.

Patrick is visiting Amy, his girlfriend of four years. Patrick attempts to explain his vision of the future, which, of course, includes Amy. She quickly cuts him off to break his heart and destroy his neatly planned life.

When Ryan arrives at Audrey's house, he expects to get some action and leave quickly. He is shocked to hear she wants more than a physical relationship. Disgusted with his reaction, Audrey steals his car – leaving him stranded with her grandmother.  The two hit the streets in her aging automobile looking for Audrey.

The four boys' stories continue throughout the night, briefly intersecting, before the sun rises and they all leave home again.

Cast

 Aaron Ashmore as Alec
 Johnny Lewis as Nolan
 Justin Mentell as Ryane
 Autumn Reeser as Jaime
 Ben Savage as Patrick
 Ryan Hansen as Anthony
 Connor Ross as Andrew
 Eve Brent as Susan Pierce
 Shoshana Bush as Audrey
 Tom Arnold as Morgan
 Robin Hines as Becky
 Matthew Castellana as Danny Yates
 Jason McMahon as Dave, the Stoner
 Edward Singletary as Doctor
 Hailey Bright as Jessica
 Christina DeRosa as Ashley
 Jay Joshua Hoffman as Jay Bob
 Alona Lewis as EMT
 Luka Apt as Party Boy

References

External links
 
 

2007 films
2007 comedy-drama films
American comedy-drama films
American independent films
Films set in Palo Alto, California
Thanksgiving in films
2007 comedy films
2007 drama films
2007 independent films
2000s English-language films
2000s American films